The 2014 America East men's basketball tournament began on March 8 and concluded with the championship game on March 15. The quarterfinals and semifinals were played on March 8 and 9 at SEFCU Arena in Albany, New York, while the 2014 championship game was held on March 15 at the home of the highest remaining seed. The winner earned an automatic bid to the 2014 NCAA tournament.

Bracket and results

See also
America East Conference
2014 America East women's basketball tournament

References

America East Conference men's basketball tournament
2013–14 America East Conference men's basketball season
2014 in sports in New York (state)
Basketball competitions in New York (state)